Kleine Elster is a river of Brandenburg, Germany. It flows into the Black Elster in Wahrenbrück.

See also
List of rivers of Brandenburg

Rivers of Brandenburg
Rivers of Germany